Robert Yager is a British born freelance photographer based in Los Angeles. Studying photography in the US, Yager decided to start documenting Los Angeles street gangs in 1991. From there, Yager has been a contributing photographer to a host of magazines.

Biography 

Robert Yager grew up in London, England and is a Los Angeles-based photographer.  With an interest in anthropology, particularly street and counter-culture and having studied Latin American Studies in the UK and Mexico, as well as photography in the US, Yager decided to delve into the world of Latino street gangs in Los Angeles. It was 1991 and he has been documenting the lives of gang members ever since.

For two decades Yager has been a contributing photographer, doing covers and features, of portraits and reportage, for a host of magazines.  Among them: The New York Times Magazine, The Observer (UK), The Independent, The Telegraph, The Guardian Weekend, The Sunday Times, Fortune, The Fader, Esquire, Rolling Stone, Newsweek and TIME.

Among the accolades he has received, Yager was awarded a fellowship from the Aaron Siskind Foundation at the School of Visual Arts in New York.

Yager published a book of photographs with great Circle Books, titled 'a.k.a. BooBoo', which covers a 14-year time span in the life of Cindy Martinez, a female gang member.  An exhibition of this work led to becoming David Lee Roth's personal photographer, documenting his return to touring the USA & Canada in Van Halen, during 2007, 2008, and again in 2012.

Awards and achievements 
2019 – Tokyo International Foto Awards Advertising winner
2019 – International Photography Awards Advertising/Fashion
2019 – PDN Photo Annual 2019 Advertising/Corporate Work winner
2012 – Finalist for the W. Eugene Smith Grant in Humanistic Photography
2008 – PDN Music Photography Award: 2nd place – David Lee Roth & Eddie Van Halen
2008 – International Photography Award: 3rd place- People/Lifestyle – David Lee Roth
2005 – International Photography Awards: 1st place – Editorial/Photo Essay – Playboys Gang Life
2004 – AOP Zeitgeist Award for editorial photography
1998 – 'Award of Excellence' Communication Arts  
1996 – ‘Individual Photographer’s Fellowship’, Aaron Siskind Foundation, School of Visual Arts, NY. 
1994/95 – 'Southern California Journalism Award', Los Angeles Press Club -'Best Photo Essay' in a weekly newspaper.  
1994 – Finalist for the W. Eugene Smith Grant in Humanistic Photography

Exhibitions 
2020: "Foremost” Photography World’s Emerging Stars Exhibition – Hotel Collective, Okinawa, Japan, 16-30 January 2020.
2019-20: “Best of Show” International Photography Awards
2019: “On The Block – Images From The Street” – House of Lucie, Los Angeles October-November 2019.
2019: “We Rise” – Los Angeles. 18-27 May 2019.
2018-19: “Ink” – Museum of Latin American Art, Long Beach, California 25 August 2018 – 3 February 2019
2018: “We Rise” – Los Angeles. 18-28 May, 2018.
2018: “How To Read El Pato Pascual” – MAK Center, West Hollywood. September 2017- January 2018.
2014: “Postcards From The Edge” – Groundworks, Downtown Los Angeles. November 2013-January 2014.
2012: "Mariposa Nocturnal" – Smoking Mirrors, Pomona, California. August–September
2011: "Land of the Lost Angels" – Canal Club, Venice, California. April 
2011: "Valley of the Dolls" – L.A. Design Center, Los Angeles, California. February 
2010: "Tonanzin" – Smoking Mirrors, Pomona, California. December 
2010: "Callajeros" – Smoking Mirrors, Pomona, California. February 
2009: "Document" – Paul Bright Gallery, Toronto, Canada. May 
2007: "a.k.a BooBoo" – A&I Photo Lab, Los Angeles, California.  June–August Solo Show
2006: "Gang Life" – Jennie Ricketts Gallery, Brighton, England. September Solo Show
2006: "Vice Show" – Silverstein Gallery, New York City, New York.  July
2005: Create:Fixate "Deluxe" – HD Buttercup, Los Angeles, California. May 
2005: "Park Your Art" (curated by Ethan Cohen) – Art LA, Santa Monica, California, January  
2004: Create:Fixate "The Photography Show" – Spring Arts Tower, Los Angeles, California,  July 
1999: "Remembrance: The Eternal Present" - Houston Center for Photography, Houston, Texas. March–May
1997: Visa Pour L’Image festival of photojournalism – Perpignan, France. September 
1997: "The Cross in a Contemporary World" – Sag Harbor Picture Gallery, Sag Harbor, New York. March–May 
1996–1997: "Wedding Days: Images of Matrimony in Photography" – Japan. May–March
1995: "P.L.A.N. (Photography in Los Angeles Now)" – Unity Arts Center and Spring Street Galleries, Los Angeles, California.  July–September
1995: "Pulp Fact" – The Photographers’ Gallery, London, England. May–June
1995: "Artists For Chiapas" – Julie Rico Gallery, Santa Monica, California. May
1994: "Current Works" – Leedy Voulkos Art Center Gallery, Kansas City, Kansas. September–October 
1993: "Wings of Change" - The Directors’ Guild of America, Los Angeles, California. November–December

References 

 
Playboys By Yager, Robert (29 September 2011) Glasschord
Ex-L.A. Gang Member Trades Streets For Family Life(Photos By Robert Yager) By Del Barco, Mandalit (6 September 2011) NPR
Gang Life by Robert Yager By DANILO (10 April 2011) Koikoikoi
Photo Loco By Dunstan, Natasha (Tash) (2011) Hell Yeah Magazine (Pages 34–43)
Capturing LA Gang Culture (October 2010) Digital Camera Magazine (Pages 30–33)
ROBERT YAGER GANG: Las pandillas de LA desde sus propias entrañas (14 July 2010)  Joia Magazine
Le gangs di Robert Yager By Grassi, Dimitri (9 November 2009) Ziguline
Robert Yager By McEvers, Kelly (2 January 2003) The Alternative Pick
La Vida Loca By Dean Brierly (December 1994) Camera & Darkroom (22–33)

External links 

"Robert Yager Photography" (Official Website)
"Robert Yager Photography" (Facebook)

Year of birth missing (living people)
Living people
20th-century British photographers
20th-century American photographers
21st-century British photographers
21st-century American photographers
Photographers from London
Photographers from Los Angeles
British expatriates in the United States